These are the official results of the Men's 10,000 metres event at the 1982 European Championships in Athens, Greece, held at Olympic Stadium "Spiros Louis" on 6 September 1982.

Medalists

Results

Final
6 September

Participation
According to an unofficial count, 18 athletes from 14 countries participated in the event.

 (1)
 (1)
 (1)
 (1)
 (1)
 (1)
 (1)
 (2)
 (1)
 (1)
 (1)
 (1)
 (2)
 (3)

See also
 1978 Men's European Championships 10,000 metres (Prague)
 1980 Men's Olympic 10,000 metres (Moscow)
 1983 Men's World Championships 10,000 metres (Helsinki)
 1984 Men's Olympic 10,000 metres (Los Angeles)
 1986 Men's European Championships 10,000 metres (Stuttgart)
 1987 Men's World Championships 10,000 metres (Rome)

References

 Results

10000 metres
10,000 metres at the European Athletics Championships
Marathons in Greece